Sarıcakaya is a town and district of Eskişehir Province in the Central Anatolia region of Turkey. According to 2000 census, population of the district is 5,642 of which 2,672 live in the town of Sarıcakaya as of 2010.

Notes

References

External links
 District municipality's official website 
 Map of Sarıcakaya district

Towns in Turkey
Populated places in Eskişehir Province
Districts of Eskişehir Province